Infinix Note 3 is an Android phablet smartphone developed and produced by Infinix Mobile. The Note 3 was unveiled November 2015 and was released globally in August 2016.

Specifications

Hardware 
The Infinix Note 3 features a 6.0-inch Full HD display with a 1920 x 1080 resolution (pixel density at 367ppi). The Note 3  which runs on a 1.3 GHz octa-core MediaTek MT6753 CPU with 2GB of RAM. The phone has metal edges around the screen.

Note 3 also incorporates a non-removable 4500mAh lithium-ion battery. The phone supports fast charge thanks to the inclusion of dual 4.5A charging engines with PE+2.0 technology. The note 3 is also equipped with Aerospace Cooling Technology (ACT). A Fingerprint scanner was also added.

Software 
The Note 3 originally shipped with Android 6.0 Marshmallow, running the custom Chameleon XOS software.

Camera 
The main (rear-facing) camera is a 13 MP autofocus camera with 0.25s autofocus while the secondary (front-facing) camera is a 3.7 MP camera.
20.7 Mega pixel

Note 3 Pro 
The Note 3 Pro was released in September, 2016 just a month after the Note 3 was made available to the public. Pro's distinguishing features are a bump up in RAM size from 2GB to 3GB and 4G capability. Other hardware and software elements relatively remained the same.

See also 
 Infinix Mobile
 Infinix Hot S3

References 

Infinix smartphones
Mobile phones introduced in 2016
Discontinued smartphones